John Murray Murdoch (May 19, 1904 – May 17, 2001) was a Canadian professional ice hockey player and coach. He played for the New York Rangers of the National Hockey League from 1926 to 1937, never missing a game in his career. With the Rangers Murdoch won the Stanley Cup twice, in 1928 and in 1933. After his playing career he coached Yale University from 1938 to 1965.

Personal life
Murdoch was born in Lucknow, Ontario and raised in Edgerton, Alberta. His parents were Walter Dryden Murdoch (b. 1875) and Jennie Bell "Jane" Murray (b. 1878). He received a Bachelor's degree in mathematics from the University of Manitoba where he played hockey from 1921 to 1924.

Hockey career
He played left wing for the New York Rangers in 508 games with 84 goals and 108 assists from the Rangers' first season in the 1926–27 NHL season until the 1936–37 NHL season. From 1938 to 1965, he was the sixth head coach of Yale University hockey team. In 1974, he was awarded the Lester Patrick Trophy for his contribution to hockey in the United States.

He was the last living player from the inaugural Rangers team in 1925.

Awards and achievements
Memorial Cup Championship (1923)
Stanley Cup Championships (1928 & 1933)
Lester Patrick Trophy Winner (1974)
Hobey Baker Legends of College Hockey Award (1987)
Honoured Member of the Manitoba Hockey Hall of Fame
 In the 2009 book 100 Ranger Greats, was ranked No. 39 all-time of the 901 New York Rangers who had played during the team's first 82 seasons

Family Links
John Murray Murdoch has several relationships with NHL players:

Dave Dryden and Ken Dryden are his first cousins twice removed. J. Murray Murdoch's parents were Jane Murray and Walter Murdoch (b 1875). Walter's half sister Maggie Murdoch (1855-1926) married Andrew Dryden (1849-1922). Their great grandsons are Dave and Ken Dryden.

Mark Messier and Paul Messier are related by marriage through Murray Murdoch's wife, Marie Heinrich. Marie was the daughter of George Heinrich and Ina Dea (d 1936). Ina's brother John Dea (d 1943 in World War II) married Alice Dodd Stiles (1911-1999). Their grandsons are the Messier brothers.

Billy Dea is also related by marriage. Ina Dea and John Dea's brother Howard Dea is Billy Dea's father, and also played professional hockey. Another one of Dea's siblings, Christine, married Murray Murdoch's uncle (his father, Walter's brother), Lovell Steele Murdoch (1881-1963) - their children being Murray Murdoch's cousins.  Former Ranger Don Murdoch  and former California Golden Seal, Cleveland Baron and St Louis Blue Bob Murdoch (ice hockey, born 1954) are grandsons of Lovell Steele Murdoch and Christine Dea Murdoch, and distant cousins of Murray,  .

Career statistics

Regular season and playoffs

Head coaching record

References

External links

1904 births
2001 deaths
Canadian ice hockey coaches
Canadian ice hockey left wingers
Ice hockey people from Alberta
Lester Patrick Trophy recipients
Manitoba Bisons ice hockey players
New York Rangers players
Philadelphia Ramblers players
Stanley Cup champions
University of Manitoba alumni
Winnipeg Maroons players
Yale Bulldogs men's ice hockey coaches
Canadian expatriate ice hockey players in the United States